

USISL
The third Baltimore Bays were a soccer team based in Baltimore, Maryland that played in the USISL. They became the Eastern Shore Sharks in 1998 when they moved to Salisbury, Maryland.

Year-by-year

Defunct soccer clubs in Maryland
Baltimore Bays
USL Second Division teams
Soccer clubs in Maryland
1993 establishments in Maryland
1998 disestablishments in Maryland
Association football clubs established in 1993
Association football clubs disestablished in 1998